Jo (sometimes written as Cho) is a Korean family name, traditionally a royal family name in Korea. As of 2000, there were 1,347,730 people by this surname in South Korea, about 1% of the total population.

List of people with the surname

People from the past
 Jo Gwangjo (1482-1520), scholar-official of the Joseon period
 Jo Man-yeong (1776-1846), father of Queen Shinjeong
 Cho Man-sik (1883-1950), activist of the Korea's independence movement

People from present times

Cho
 Alina Cho, American journalist
 Arden Cho, American actress
 Cho Byung-hwa, South Korean poet, critic and essayist
 Cho Byung-kuk, South Korean football player
 Cho Chi-hun, South Korean poet, critic, and activist
 Cho Chikun, South Korean Go player
 David Yonggi Cho, South Korean Christian minister
 Erica Cho, American artist
 Frank Cho, Korean-American comic writer
 Cho Gue-sung, South Korean footballer
 Henry Cho, American stand-up comedian
 Cho Hunhyun, South Korean Go player
 Cho Hye-ri (stage name Wax), South Korean singer
 Cho Hyun, South Korean football player
 Cho Hyun-doo, South Korean football player
 Cho Jae-hyun, South Korean actor
 Cho Jae-jin, retired South Korean football player
 Cho Ja-young (stage name Ah Young), South Korean singer, member of girl group Dal Shabet
 John Cho, Korean-American actor
 Cho Ki-jung, South Korean potter
 Cho Kyu-hyun, South Korean singer, member of boy band Super Junior 
 Liz Cho, American newscaster
 Margaret Cho, American comedian
 Cho Mi-yeon, South Korean singer, member of girl group (G)I-DLE
 Cho Mi-hye (stage name Miryo), South Korean rapper, member of girl group Brown Eyed Girls
 Cho Min-woo, South Korean footballer
 Cho Myung-ik (stage name Mikey), South Korean singer, member of boy band Turbo
 Cho Minhaeng, South Korean scientist
 Cho Nam-chul (1923–2006), South Korean Go player
 Cho Namgi, Chinese 3-star General of Korean descent
 Cho PD, South Korean record producer and rapper
 Raymond Cho, Korean-Canadian politician and Ontario government minister
 Sam Cho, Korean-American politician and entrepreneur
 Seong-Jin Cho, South Korean classical pianist
 Cho Seung-woo, South Korean actor
 Seung-Hui Cho, South Korean mass murderer, responsible for perpetrating the Virginia Tech shooting
 Cho Seung-youn, South Korean singer-songwriter, member of boy band Uniq
 Cho So-hyun, South Korean footballer
 Cho Son-jin, South Korean Go player
 Cho Won-hee, South Korean former footballer
 Cho Yeo-jeong, South Korean actress
 Cho Yong-pil, South Korean singer
 Cho Yoon-Kyoung, South Korean interdisciplinary researcher
 Cho Yoon-sun, South Korean politician
 Cho Yoon-jeong, retired South Korean tennis player 
 Cho Yoon-woo, South Korean actor 
 Cho Yu-min, South Korean footballer
 Cho Zang-hee, South Korean neuroscientist

 Fictional characters
 Amadeus Cho, a character in Marvel Comics
 Kimball Cho, a character in The Mentalist
 Dr. Isabel Cho, one of the four main protagonists in Dead Space: Aftermath
 Cho Cheol-gang, the main antagonist in Crash Landing on You
 Cho Sang-woo, a character in Squid Game
 Jo Yi-seo, the female lead of Itaewon Class 
 Teacher Jo, the secretary of the main antagonist in Sky Castle
 Jo Yeong and Jo Eun-sup, two characters in The King: Eternal Monarch

Jo
 Jo Hye-joo, South Korean actress and model
 Jo Hyeon-woo, South Korean football goalkeeper
 Jo Hyun-jae, South Korean actor
 Jo In-sung, South Korean actor
 Jo Jinho, South Korean singer, member of boy band Pentagon
 Jo Kwon, South Korean singer and entertainer, member of boy band 2AM
 Jo Min-su, South Korean actress
 Jo Myong-rok (1928–2010), North Korean politician
 Jo Se-ho, South Korean comedian
 Jo Shin-ae, South Korean actress
 Sumi Jo, Grammy-award-winning South Korean coloratura soprano
 Jo Sung-mo, South Korean singer
 Jo Yong-in, South Korean League of Legends player
 Jo Yu-ri, South Korean singer and actress, former member of girl group Iz*One
 Jo Sung-woo (stage name Code Kunst), South Korean composer
 Jo Gwang-il, South Korean rapper and songwriter
 Jo Woo-chan, South Korean rapper

Notes

See also
 Zhao (surname)
 Cho (Royal Korean family name)
 List of Korean family names
 List of common Korean surnames
Surnames of Korean origin
Korean-language surnames